The 2016 Stan Wawrinka tennis season begins at the Chennai Open, where he won the fourth title and the third in a row at Chennai.

Year summary

Australian Open and early hard court season

Chennai
Wawrinka started his 2016 tennis campaign by playing at the 2016 Aircel Chennai Open, where he was bidding for his third straight title win in a row. Wawrinka won against Andrey Rublev, Guillermo García-López and Benoît Paire in straight sets, before facing Borna Ćorić in the final. At the final, he won the match in straight sets 6-3 7-5, winning him also his fourth Chennai title in his career, and his twelfth career title overall.

Australian Open
After winning the title in Chennai, Wawrinka participated in the first Grand Slam of the season in the 2016 Australian Open. He first faced Dmitry Tursunov who is participating on his first Grand Slam after more than a year of being absent on the tour due to injury. Wawrinka won the first two sets before Tursunov retired from the match. Wawrinka then faced Radek Štěpánek in the second round, where he was able to defeat the Czech in straight sets. He then faced another Czech in Lukáš Rosol in the third round, where Wawrinka defeated him also in straight sets. At the fourth round, he faced Canadian Milos Raonic in the fourth round. Raonic was able to win the first two sets against Wawrinka, but Wawrinka was able to push the match into a decider. Wawrinka was not able to fully come back however, as Raonic was able to win the deciding set 6-3. The loss stops the streak of six straight Grand Slam quarterfinals that started during the 2014 Wimbledon Championships.

Indoor hard-court tournaments
Wawrinka did not appear in Rotterdam to defend his title.

Marseille
Wawrinka after receiving a first round bye would get revenge on Sergiy Stakhovsky in a tight three set match, who defeated him in the quarterfinals the previous year, but he would go on to lose to good friend Benoît Paire in the next round in three sets.

Dubai
After being two points from defeat in his opening round match against Stakhovsky, Wawrinka proceeded to defeat qualifier Franko Skugor, Philipp Kohlschreiber, and Nick Kyrgios (in their first match since the Montreal incident in 2015) in succession, before defeating Marcos Baghdatis in straight sets to win the Dubai Duty Free title.

March Masters

Indian Wells
Wawrinka advanced to the round of 16, where he was defeated by David Goffin in a final set tiebreak.

Miami Open
Wawrinka lost his opening round match to Andrey Kuznetsov (tennis)

European clay court season

Monte Carlo
Wawrinka lost in the quarterfinals to eventual champion Rafael Nadal.

After early exits in Madrid and Rome, Wawrinka won the Geneva Open, defeating Marin Cilic in the final in two close sets.

Roland Garros
Wawrinka entered as the defending champion. In the first round he survived Lukas Rosol, coming from 2 sets to 1 down to win in five. He went on to reach the semifinals, where his title defense was ended by Andy Murray in four sets.

Grass court season

Queen's Club Championships
Wawrinka lost his opening match to Fernando Verdasco in straight sets.

Wimbledon
Wawrinka defeated rising star Taylor Fritz in four close sets in the first round. He was then upset by Juan Martin del Potro in the second round in four close sets.

All matches
This table chronicles all the matches of Stan Wawrinka in 2016, including walkovers (W/O) which the ATP does not count as wins. They are marked ND for non-decision or no decision.

Singles matches

Doubles matches

Exhibition matches

Tournament schedule

Singles

Yearly records

Head-to-head matchups
Stan Wawrinka had a  match win–loss record in the 2016 season. The following list is ordered by number of wins:

 Lukáš Rosol 4–0
 Marin Čilić 2–0
 Philipp Kohlschreiber 2–0 
 Illya Marchenko 2–0
 Sergiy Stakhovsky 2–0
 Viktor Troicki 2–0
 Albert Ramos 2–0
 Benoît Paire 2–1
 Kevin Anderson 1–0
 Marcos Baghdatis 1–0
 Roberto Bautista Agut 1–0
 Pablo Carreño 1–0
 Jérémy Chardy 1–0
 Marco Chiudinelli 1–0
 Borna Ćorić 1–0
 Taro Daniel 1–0
 Novak Djokovic 1–0
 Jared Donaldson 1–0
 Kyle Edmund 1–0
 Daniel Evans 1–0
 Taylor Fritz 1–0
 Guillermo García López 1–0
 Alessandro Giannessi 1–0
 Andrey Rublev 1–0 
 Jack Sock 1–0
 Franko Škugor 1–0
 Radek Štěpánek 1–0
 Dmitry Tursunov 1–0
 Donald Young 1–0
 Mikhail Youzhny 1–0
 Juan Martín del Potro 1–1
 Nick Kyrgios 1–1
 Andrey Kuznetsov 1–1
 Gilles Simon 1–1
 Fernando Verdasco 1–1
 Kei Nishikori 1–2
 Grigor Dimitrov 0–1
 David Goffin 0–1
 Juan Mónaco 0–1
 Rafael Nadal 0–1
 Milos Raonic 0–1
 Alexander Zverev 0–1
 Mischa Zverev 0–1
 Jan-Lennard Struff 0–1
 Andy Murray 0–2

Finals

Singles: 5 (4–1)

Earnings

 Figures in United States dollars (USD) unless noted.

See also
 2016 ATP World Tour
 2016 Roger Federer tennis season
 2016 Rafael Nadal tennis season
 2016 Novak Djokovic tennis season
 2016 Andy Murray tennis season

References

External links
2016 Schedule at ATP World Tour

Wawrinka
Wawrinka
2016 in Swiss tennis
2016 in Swiss sport